In Greek mythology, Iardanus (Ancient Greek: Ἰάρδανος or Ἰαρδάνης) is a semi-legendary figure who was the father of Omphale, queen of the people who were formerly called Maeonians, but later Lydians. According to legend, he (or Omphale) bought Heracles as a slave. Herodotus implies that Iardanus was a Maeonian king of Lydia.

See also
 List of kings of Lydia

Notes

References
 Apollodorus, The Library with an English Translation by Sir James George Frazer, F.B.A., F.R.S. in 2 Volumes, Cambridge, MA, Harvard University Press; London, William Heinemann Ltd. 1921. ISBN 0-674-99135-4. Online version at the Perseus Digital Library. Greek text available from the same website.
Diodorus Siculus. Bibliotheca Historica, Book 4.31.5
Diodorus Siculus, The Library of History translated by Charles Henry Oldfather. Twelve volumes. Loeb Classical Library. Cambridge, Massachusetts: Harvard University Press; London: William Heinemann, Ltd. 1989. Vol. 3. Books 4.59–8. Online version at Bill Thayer's Web Site
Diodorus Siculus, Bibliotheca Historica. Vol 1-2. Immanel Bekker. Ludwig Dindorf. Friedrich Vogel. in aedibus B. G. Teubneri. Leipzig. 1888-1890. Greek text available at the Perseus Digital Library.

Herodotus, The Histories with an English translation by A. D. Godley. Cambridge. Harvard University Press. 1920. . Online version at the Topos Text Project. Greek text available at Perseus Digital Library.
 Pseudo-Apollodorus. Bibliotheca, Book 2.6.3

Kings of Lydia

Kings in Greek mythology
Anatolian characters in Greek mythology